Good Grief is an American sitcom that aired for 13 episodes on Fox from September 30, 1990, to February 3, 1991.

Premise
Good Grief focuses on a funeral home called "The Sincerity Mortuary" in Dacron, Ohio run by strait-laced Warren Pepper (Joel Brooks), his sister Debbie (Wendy Schaal), and her flamboyant husband Ernie Lapidus (Howie Mandel), who was determined to "put the 'fun' back in 'funeral'." Tom Poston and Sheldon Feldner played assistants Ringo Prowley and Raoul, respectively.

Cast
Howie Mandel as Ernie Lapidus
Wendy Schaal as Debbie Lapidus
Joel Brooks as Warren Pepper
Sheldon Feldner as Raoul
Tom Poston as Ringo Prowley

Episodes

Production 
According to the show's creator Stu Silver, the project had been turned down by every network and cable channel in 1983.

References

External links
 

1990s American sitcoms
1990 American television series debuts
1991 American television series endings
English-language television shows
Fox Broadcasting Company original programming
Funeral homes in fiction
Television series by 20th Century Fox Television
Television shows set in Ohio
Television shows about death